Moraikobai is an Amerindian village located in the Mahaica-Berbice of Guyana, South America.

History

The community was initially called “Moracoba”; a name that was birthed from a combination of two Arawak words; ‘Mora’ meaning tree and ‘Coba’ meaning stump. However, several decades ago the name was officially changed to ‘Moraikobai’. Dorothy Patoir is said to be the first individual born in the village when it was established many decades ago. Presently, the village is led by a Toshao (Indigenous leader).

Geography

The geographical construct of the village is relatively large, naturally fertile, and mostly unoccupied. Logging and farming are the major economic activities of the village.

Features

Moraikobai has a rich religious heritage, and its people endorse the Christian religion to a large extent. In this respect, the village consists of three churches including an Anglican church which was established when the community was first inaugurated as a mission. It follows that in the early days the village was known as St. Francis Mission and later, St. Francis District. Moraikobai is also known for its huge benab and exquisite handicraft produced by its skilled residents.

Moraikobai is supported by a health centre, nursery and primary schools and a guest house, which is funded by the Regional Democratic Council (RDC) of region 5. Secondary schooling is done in Mahaicony.

References

External links 

 Heritage Day at Moraikobai  from Guyana Chronicle 2005-09-11 (The University of Florida Digital Collections (UFDC))

Populated places in Mahaica-Berbice
Indigenous villages in Guyana